The Tustin News was a newspaper covering the community of Tustin, California.

History
The paper was founded in 1922, with Timothy Brownhill serving as the first editor until June 1923 when it was sold to Rev. John Winterbourne. After a number of other short-term owners it was purchased by William and Lucille Moses on July 25, 1956, who retained ownership for 39 years until 1995 when it was purchased by the OC Register in 1995. In 2018, the Register merged the News into the Irvine World News.

References

External links
Tustin News E-edition

Weekly newspapers published in California
1922 establishments in California
Publications established in 1922